Julio César Fonseca is a retired Honduran football player who played for Marathón in the 1960s.

Club career
Nicknamed Cucaracha, Fonseca scored 19 league goals for Marathón. He was a member of the so-called La Trinca Infernal (The Infernal Lashing), along with Mario Caballero and Mauro Caballero.

Retirement
In 1974, Fonseca retired from professional football after Mario, one of his teammates at Marathón, had an accident which leave him invalid.

References

Year of birth missing (living people)
Living people
Honduran footballers
Honduras international footballers
C.D. Marathón players
Liga Nacional de Fútbol Profesional de Honduras players
Association football wingers